Herbert Körner (8 February 1902 – 27 May 1966) was a German cinematographer.

Selected filmography
 The Strange Case of Captain Ramper (1927)
 Life's Circus (1928)
 Mariett Dances Today (1928)
 Taxi at Midnight (1929)
 Spell of the Looking Glass (1932)
 The Hunter from Kurpfalz (1933)
 You Are Adorable, Rosmarie (1934)
 Pappi (1934)
 What Am I Without You (1934)
 Forget Me Not (1935)
 My Life for Maria Isabella (1935)
 Family Parade (1936)
 Woman's Love—Woman's Suffering (1937)
 Love Can Lie (1937)
 The Coral Princess (1937)
 White Slaves (1937)
 We Danced Around the World (1939)
 Sky Hounds (1942)
 When the Young Wine Blossoms (1943)
 The Appeal to Conscience (1949)
 When Men Cheat (1950)
 Wedding Night In Paradise (1950)
 Dark Eyes (1951)
 Not Without Gisela (1951)
 The Chaste Libertine (1952)
 Fritz and Friederike (1952)  
 My Wife Is Being Stupid (1952)
 The Seven Dresses of Katrin (1954)
 My Leopold (1955)
 Love, Summer and Music (1956)

References

Bibliography
 Giesen, Rolf. Nazi Propaganda Films: A History and Filmography. McFarland, 2003.

External links

1902 births
1966 deaths
German cinematographers
People from the Province of Brandenburg
People from Fürstenwalde
Film people from Brandenburg